Miss BG (short for Big Girl) is a 3D animated series based on the French children's book series "Gudule" authored by Fanny Joly, illustrated by Roser Capdevila and published by Hachette-Jeunesse. The original English version was later dubbed in French under the retitle Bravo Gudule.

The title was copyrighted in 2004 and production began in 2005.

It is a joint Canadian/French production and is distributed by Breakthrough Animation. Fifty-two 30-minute episodes (each having 2 stories, also aired separately as 104 episodes of 15 minutes) have been produced to date. The developers also described it as having two seasons each having fifty-two 13-minute episodes with two 26-minute specials and twenty-four 2-minute fillers.

Synopsis

"BG" stands for "Bella Gloria" and her surname is Baxter. The main character of the series, Miss BG, is an 8-year-old girl according to Breakthrough Animation. Her brother George has a very active personality and dotes on his pet hamster Albert.

BG is an energetic redhead girl who hangs out in a tree house with two friends, Gad and Alex. Gad's father, Mr. Mansour, owns the neighborhood market while Alex's older brother Robbie is a teenager who often lends a hand when the children need the aid of an older person, escorts them to and from school plus generally chaperones them when they are out and about.

Other characters in the series include Brittany-Ann, a wealthy blonde rival of BG, Kayla, Brittany-Ann's brunette best friend, Billy, a boastful, brown-haired, athletic 9-year-old boy who is also Brittany-Ann's friend and crush, Terri, a teenage girl who babysits Miss BG and George, Alice, her aunt, and Ouma, Gad's grandmother who lives with his family.

Miss BG aired on qubo and Smile of a Child in the United States, TVOKids in Canada, M2 in Hungary, Cartoonito in the United Kingdom, ABC1 in Australia, Minimax in Romania, TiJi and France 5 in France, RTE Two's The Den in Ireland and Ketnet in Belgium.

Characters

Main family
BG (French: Gudule) is 7 and later 8 years old. BG is a redheaded girl who is curious about everything around her and plunges head-on into adventures and escapades. She's a natural leader amongst her friends, even though she can be slightly bossy at times. She's also a bit of a tomboy, and loves to hang out with her best friends Gad and Alex in their tree house. BG is protective of her little brother George, but can lose patience with him too; especially when he insists on playing with her and her "grownup" friends all the time.
George (French: Gaston) is BG's adorable younger redheaded brother. George looks up to his older sister and always wants to play with her and her friends, especially in the tree house. George tries to be like BG at times, copying her words and actions, and her approval is very important to him. Sensitive and sweet-natured, George is less self-confident than BG, but his insights into people and situations can sometimes be surprising. He is 3 and later 4 years old, and watches a TV program called "Fishy the Fish".
Albert (nicknamed Albie) is George's beloved pet hamster who travels around perched on George's head.
Dad (French: Papa) is named Jeffrey Baxter Redheaded like his children, good-natured and easygoing, Dad is the local vet. He's aware that BG has him wrapped around her finger. He usually says "yes" to anything while watching TV and on the rare occasion when he says "no," a few tears will work wonders. Still, Dad has his breaking point, and when he makes up his mind, no one can change it.
Mom (French: Maman) aka Charlotte is the brunette mother of BG and George who works from the house as a freelance journalist who writes articles. She is always busy trying to juggle her career while looking after her family and her younger sister. She's warm, sympathetic and more understanding of her daughter than BG realizes, but she is tough. She doesn't lose her temper very often, but when she does, even BG runs for cover.
Aunt Alice (French: Tante Alice) is Charlotte's (younger?) sister. She spends a lot of time at BG's house and loves to spend time with BG and George and do projects with them when their parents are out. She's BG's favorite babysitter.

Others
Alex (French: Bertrand) is one of BG's best friends. He has blonde hair and wears a shirt with green and white stripes and wears red glasses. He often hangs out with BG in the treehouse.
Gad Mansour (French: Cheb) is a black boy and, along with Alex, one of BG's best friends, but he's a little shy and quieter than both BG and Alex. But BG knows she can always count on him to help find a solution to any problem. Gad is a science whiz, loves studying and inventing things. He lives with his grandmother and father, who owns a local grocery store.
Brittany Ann McAdams (French: Marie-Aglae) is BG's wealthy, blonde next-door neighbor - and sometimes nemesis or rival. Rich, spoiled, and pretty, Brittany-Ann thinks she's very special and loves to brag to BG and to her friends. She constantly competes for attention from the other kids. Underneath Brittany-Ann's spoiled persona, she hides a glimpse of insecurity. Her vain preoccupation with her looks is in marked contrast to BG's tomboyish approach to life. She wears her curly blonde hair in a low ponytail with a white hair tie, an orange-red shirt with a white collar, a green and red plaid skirt, white knee socks and red strapped shoes.
Brittany Ann's mom is named Mrs. McAdams
Doodlebug is Brittany-Ann's pet dog. She sometimes shortens her names to Doodles. Closed captions misspells the nickname as "Doddles".
Terri (French: Florence) is the black-haired babysitter of BG and George when their aunt is not available. She's studying at college, but she loves to spend time with the kids. She especially likes dancing with BG, who has learned a lot of steps from her. Terri also likes baking cakes for BG and George and especially loves it when they show her their drawings.
Ouma Mansour (French: Djeda) is Gad's grandmother, who lives with him and his Dad. She takes care of all the housework and cooking for them, and she tends a vegetable garden behind the family grocery store. BG likes to seek Ouma out when she needs help.
Billy (French: Paulo) is (at 9 or 10-years-old,) is a brown-haired boy and the oldest in his and BG's class, and so he thinks the rest are all babies. Billy is great at skating, and he likes to show off his skills to BG and all her friends. He also has a crush on Brittany-Ann. Billy is Kayla's brother.
Kayla (French: Carla) is Billy's brunette younger sister. She is also Brittany-Ann's best friend, and she is often with her. She often does everything Brittany-Ann tells her to, much to BG's disdain. She wears her brown hair in pigtails, a light green long sleeved shirt, a purpley-pink jumper with some Cherries on it and dark green leggings with purpley-pink shoes.
Titus is Kayla's female hamster who resembles George's hamster, Albert, and sometimes they can't tell them apart.
Mr. Ahmed Mansour (French: M. Mansour) is Gad's father and Ouma's son.
Robbie (French: Thomas) is Alex's blonde older brother. He and Terri are often together.
Mrs. Martin (French: Mme. Martin) is a blonde-haired math and science teacher who is also the homeroom teacher for BG, Gad, Alex, Brittany-Ann, Kayla & Billy.
Mr. Tyrone Grant (French: M. Grant) is the school principal who also teaches gym and occasionally substitutes for BG, Gad, Alex, Brittany-Ann, Kayla, and Billy. He has a dog named Mitzi. He also runs a toy drive in "Show and Tell".
Ian is George's friend.
Alex's dad the blonde-haired father of Alex and probably also Robbie.

Cast

Credited
BG Baxter/Narrator: Hannah Endicott-Douglas
George Baxter: Nissae Isen
Alex: Billy Rosemberg
Gad Mansour: Cameron Ansell
Brittany-Ann McAdams: Rebecca Brenner
Charlotte Baxter: Susan Roman
Jeffery Baxter: Neil Crone
Aunt Alice: Stephanie Morgenstern
Terri: Leah Cudmore
Robbie: Bill Houston
Billy: Darcy Smith (season 1) and Jordan Devon (season 2)
Kayla: Melanie Tonello
Mr. Mansour: Juan Chioran
Ouma Mansour: Dawn Greenhalgh
Mr. Tyrone Grant: Martin Roach
Mrs. Martin: Catherine Disher
Mrs. McAdams: Laura de Carteret

Uncredited
Ron Pardo - Captain Shimmer
Robert Tinkler - Alex's Dad
Robin Duke - Ian
John Stocker - Mr. Otis
Ron Rubin - TBA
Tracey Moore - Malinda

Episodes
The series has 102 segments spread among 52 episodes, with 2 apiece.

Season 1 is 52 episodes 13 minutes each.

ASK BG shorts
Miss BG Vignette episodes are 2-minute "Lessons" or "Tips" given to the audience by BG. These ‘tips’ are always factually correct and have underlying social development themes; the humour lies in how BG executes them. As we know with BG, things never go exactly the way she plans. BG will speak directly to camera, addressing the audience. Her TV lessons will interact with a future website, which kids can then access to receive further info.

References

External links

TVO original programming
Canadian television shows based on children's books
French television shows based on children's books
Animated television series about children
2000s Canadian animated television series
2005 Canadian television series debuts
2008 Canadian television series endings
Canadian children's animated comedy television series
Canadian children's animated fantasy television series
Canadian computer-animated television series
2000s French animated television series
2005 French television series debuts
2008 French television series endings
French children's animated comedy television series
French children's animated fantasy television series
French computer-animated television series